John Murray Field is home to Redlands Baseball Club in Sheldon, about  southeast of Brisbane, Queensland, Australia. It is a fully fenced and regulation size field with field level fenced dugouts, 2 bullpens, 2 indoor battery cages with an automated pitching machine, an air-conditioned scorers box. Floodlighting is of AAA standard and has hosted trial games for various countries including the Netherlands, Italy and United States.
Opposite to John Murray Field is the Tony Street Field which serves as a playing field for juniors and minor league senior teams as well as a warm up and training field.

Redlands has hosted the Claxton Shield 2008 for the Queensland Rams and will host three Claxton Shield 2009 games.

References

Baseball venues in Australia
Sports venues in Brisbane